Boglárka Horti (born 1 July 1998) is a Hungarian footballer who plays as a defender for Viktória FC and the Hungary women's national team.

Career
Horti is a member of the Hungary national team. She made her debut for the team on 1 December 2020, against Iceland.

Personal life
Her father, Gábor Horti, is a sports commentator and television presenter. Horti grew up in the village of Csömör.

References

1998 births
Living people
Women's association football defenders
Hungarian women's footballers
Hungary women's international footballers
Viktória FC-Szombathely players